Manternach is a commune and small town in eastern Luxembourg. It is part of the canton of Grevenmacher.

, the town of Manternach, which lies in the south of the commune, has a population of 417.  Other towns within the commune include Berbourg, Lellig, and Munschecker.

Manternach railway station has regular services directly to Luxembourg railway station in Luxembourg city and Wasserbillig.There are normally 35 trains per day travelling from Manternach to Luxembourg

Population

Image gallery

References

External links
 

 
Communes in Grevenmacher (canton)
Towns in Luxembourg